The Super Essex Conference (SEC) is a high school athletic conference located in Essex County, New Jersey. The conference was formed in 2009 by the New Jersey State Interscholastic Athletic Association and was a result of a larger realignment that swept through North Jersey. The Super Essex Conference was formed by all of Essex County's high schools, the majority of which either came from the NNJIL, Iron Hills, Northern Hills, or Colonial Hills conferences. Several schools were members of either the Mountain Valley or Watchung conferences, while several further were independent. The only school that did not participate was St. Benedict's Preparatory School, which is not part of the NJSIAA's jurisdiction.

Divisions
The Super Essex Conference, has adopted a strength of program alignment that places all the stronger programs in the top division and the weaker programs in the lower division with schools moving up or down every two years based on performance. It's similar to the system used statewide for hockey and lacrosse.

Member schools

Recent Additions
For the 2011-2012 school year the conference added three new members in Christ the King Prep, Newark Tech High School, and North 13th Street Tech. All three schools are located in Newark, New Jersey.

References

External links 
 http://www.nj.com/news/index.ssf/2009/06/essex_county_athletic_director.html
 http://blog.nj.com/hssportsextra/2008/01/essex_conference.html
 http://maplewood.patch.com/articles/superessex-realignment-breakdown-2
 http://www.njsiaa.org/ <See 2010-2011 League Affiliations>
 http://www.sec.powermediallc.org <official website>

New Jersey high school athletic conferences